This article displays the rosters for the participating teams at the 2016 South American Basketball Championship. The player ages are as of  June 26, which was the first day of the tournament.

Group A

Bolivia

Ecuador

Paraguay

Group B

Chile

Colombia

Peru

Uruguay

References

External links 
ARCHIVE.FIBA.COM

South American Basketball Championship squads
2016 in South American sport